Saranbar-e Kalantari (also Romanized as Saranbār-e Kalantarī; also known as Sar Anbār) is a village in Teshkan Rural District, Chegeni District, Dowreh County, Lorestan Province, Iran. At the 2006 census, its population was 482, in 108 families.

References 

Towns and villages in Dowreh County